Putative gonadotropin-releasing hormone II receptor is a protein that in humans is encoded by the GNRHR2 gene.

Function 

The receptor for gonadotropin releasing hormone 2 (GnRH2) is encoded by the GnRH2 receptor (GnRHR2) gene. In non-hominoid primates and non-mammalian vertebrates, GnRHR2 encodes a seven-transmembrane G protein-coupled receptor. However, in human, the N-terminus of the predicted protein contains a frameshift and premature stop codon. In human, GnRHR2 transcription occurs but whether the gene produces a functional C-terminal multi-transmembrane protein is currently unresolved. Alternative splice variants have been reported. An untranscribed pseudogene of GnRHR2 is also on chromosome 14.

See also
 Gonadotropin-releasing hormone receptor

References

Further reading

External links
 

G protein-coupled receptors